SupaRed is an album by SupaRed, a band led by ex-Helloween vocalist Michael Kiske. It was released on Helloween's former record label Noise Records.

Background
Kiske both produced and mixed the album by himself. The album was recorded in Kiskes own studio. It was a songwriting process and then the band members gradually recorded it. The guitars were recorded live at times.

He said in 2003: "Rock music as such is just a band story. With the solo albums I just had a lot to do with myself, had to sort and redefine a lot. At that point it was just fine to do solo records, but rock music is not for solo artists."

Kiske wanted a name that cannot be defined immediately, that has no special meaning, but just sounded good. Translated, it actually means nothing, except strong red.

He also said 2003: "I think it's unfair to compare Supared to Helloween, I know that people will compare it no matter what I think of it. It goes with the territory. You can't really compare the music, because it's an entirely different band."

Sandro Giampietro played guitar on Kiske's solo works Kiske (2006) and "Past In Different Ways" (2008), and was a co-songwriter for Unisonic on the songs "Blood" and "Manhunter" on the album "Light of Dawn" (2014).

Track listing
 "Reconsider" - 4:12
 "Can I Know Now?" - 4:46
 "Let's Be Heroes" - 4:16
 "He Pretends" - 3:56
 "Freak-Away" - 3:46
 "Hey" - 4:55
 "Boiling Points Of No Reburn" - 4:00
 "Ride On" - 5:00
 "Hackneyed" - 3:33
 "That's Why" - 3:00
 "A Bit Of Her" - 4:02
 "Overrated" - 3:33
 "Dancers Bug" - 2:34
 "Turn It" - 3:24
All songs are written by Kiske. Except 1. Kiske/Taraxes, and 10. Kiske/Giampietro.

Credits

Band members
 Michael Kiske – vocals, guitar, keyboard
 Sandro Giampietro – guitars
 Aldo Harms – Bass
 Jurgen Spiegel – drums

References

2003 albums
Michael Kiske albums
Noise Records albums
Sanctuary Records albums